Denduluru is a mandal in Eluru district in the state of Andhra Pradesh in India.

Demographics
According to Indian census, 2001, the demographic details of Denduluru mandal is as follows:
 Total Population: 	65,768	in 17,118 Households
 Male Population: 	33,098	and Female Population: 	32,670		
 Children Under 6-years of age: 8,223	(Boys -	4,231 and Girls -	3,992)
 Total Literates: 	38,768

Towns and villages 

 census, the mandal has 26 settlements. Denduluru is the most populated and Uppugudem is the least populated village in the mandal.

The settlements in the mandal are listed below:

References 

Mandals in Eluru district